Batinkov is a Bulgarian surname. Notable people with the surname include:

Aleksandar Batinkov (born 1985), Bulgarian gymnast
Slavcho Batinkov (born 1969), Bulgarian skier

Bulgarian-language surnames